East Winch Common is a  biological Site of Special Scientific Interest south-east of King's Lynn in Norfolk. It is common land and is managed by the Norfolk Wildlife Trust.

This site is mainly wet acid heath on peat, and it is dominated by heather and cross-leaved heath. There are many wet hollows, which have diverse fen and mire flora, and areas of young woodland.

The reserve is open to the public.

References

Norfolk Wildlife Trust
Sites of Special Scientific Interest in Norfolk